Belize Christian Academy (BCA) is a private school in Belmopan, Belize serving Kindergarten through 12th grade.

As of 2015 the student body, originating from over 15 countries, numbered at about 235. Several students are sons and/or daughters of staff members at the U.S., Salvadoran, and Mexican embassies and the British High Commission. The school was established in 1993.

The school has bus services to Belmopan and other parts of Cayo District.

See also
 QSI International School of Belize
 The Island Academy - School in San Pedro, Belize
 St. Ann's Anglican Church - Church in Belmopan, Belize

References

External links
 

Belmopan
Schools in Belize
Christian schools
1993 establishments in Belize
Educational institutions established in 1993